Louisiana Highway 415 (LA 415) is a state highway in Louisiana.

Route description
LA 415 begins at Interstate 10's exit 151 in West Baton Rouge Parish, west of Port Allen. Just north of the interchange, LA 415 begins a concurrency with LA 76. The two routes travel north as a four-lane undivided highway with a center turn lane. After LA 76 exits the concurrency, LA 415 continues north and widens to a divided highway. In the unincorporated community of Lobdell, LA 415 turns off the divided highway to continue north on a two-lane undivided road. LA 415 makes two sharp turns to pass under US 190 and LA 1 with access to eastbound US 190 and southbound LA 1 being provided via nearby roads. Just before a levee to the Mississippi River, the road comes to a T-intersection with LA 986 at its northern terminus. LA 415 makes a left onto the road paralleling the levee.

The road continues to parallel the levee through northern West Baton Rouge and eastern Pointe Coupee parishes passing multiple minor state highways along its route. Near its northernmost stretches, LA 415 travels on land that was once the channel of the Mississippi River. Access to the lake formerly part of the river, known as the False River, is provided by LA 416 and LA 414, the latter of which has a  concurrency with LA 415. The highway turns west away from the Mississippi River at LA 981's southern terminus.

Major junctions

Spur route

Louisiana Spur Highway 415 (SPUR LA 415) is a  highway in Port Allen, Louisiana. It runs from south to north, connecting mainline LA 415 with US 190 and LA 1.

Starting at an intersection with LA 415 and LA 987-3, LA 415 Spur serves the purpose of moving traffic from US 190 onto LA 415 south towards I-10 and Baton Rouge. It is signed southbound as South Spur LA 415, but is signed northbound only as Alternate Route I-10.

References

External links

LADOTD map of Numbered Highways in Louisiana
Louisiana State Highway Log

0415
Transportation in West Baton Rouge Parish, Louisiana
Transportation in Pointe Coupee Parish, Louisiana
415